"I Like the Way" is a single by Anglo-Irish DJ Dylan Burns and Australian singer Kaz James, collectively known as BodyRockers. It was released on 18 April 2005 and later appeared on the group's self-titled debut album. The single debuted and peaked at number three on the UK Singles Chart, staying in the top 75 for 40 weeks. The song also climbed the charts in the United States following its feature in a Diet Coke ("Loft") commercial, peaking at number 20 on the Billboard Hot Dance Club Play chart and reaching number seven on the Billboard Hot Dance Airplay chart.

Worldwide, the single peaked at number seven in New Zealand and number eight in Denmark while becoming a top-20 hit in Australia, Austria, Finland, Ireland and Italy. The song's music video was directed by Trudy Bellinger.

Track listings

Australian maxi-CD single
 "I Like the Way" (radio edit) – 3:22
 "I Like the Way" (Junior Jack 'Rock da House' club mix) – 8:10
 "I Like the Way" (Tom Neville Touch My Body mix) – 7:28
 "I Like the Way" (Linus Loves mix) – 5:46
 "I Like the Way" (Bimbo Jones Delano mix) – 6:50
 "I Like the Way" (full length) – 6:45

UK CD single
 "I Like the Way" (radio edit)
 "I Like the Way" (Bimbo Jones Delano edit)

UK 12-inch single
A1. "I Like the Way" (full length version)
A2. "I Like the Way" (Tom Neville Touch My Body mix)
B1. "I Like the Way" (Junior Jack 'Rock da House' club mix)
B2. "I Like the Way" (Linus Loves mix)

US 12-inch single
A1. "I Like the Way" (album version) – 6:44
A2. "I Like the Way" (Junior Jack 'Rock da House' dub mix) – 8:10
B1. "I Like the Way" (Bimbo Jones Delano mix) – 6:49
B2. "I Like the Way" (Herd & Fitz remix) – 8:37

Charts and certifications

Weekly charts

Year-end charts

Certifications

References

2005 debut singles
2005 songs
Mercury Records singles
Music videos directed by Trudy Bellinger
Universal Records singles